Pål Anders Ullevålseter (born 7 December 1968, in Oslo) is a Norwegian rally raid motorcycle rider.

He came in second at the 2010 Dakar Rallye, captured the 2004 FIM Cross-Country Rallies World Championship and has won the Africa Eco Race twice.

Dakar Rally
He has competed in the Dakar Rally 11 times and was the first Norwegian to complete the race. His best result came in 2010 when he came in second, finishing just over an hour behind winner Cyril Despres.

Africa Eco Race 
He won the Africa Eco Race in 2015 and 2016, dominating completely the races, and winning 16 stages. Prior to the 2016 edition, Ullevålseter had stated, his goal was not to win the race, but to raise as much money as possible for a school in Dakar, founded by Fabrizio Meoni, who died during the Dakar Rallye in 2005. In 2017, Ullevålseter finished second overall behind South African Gev Sella.

FIM Cross-Country Rallies World Championship 
In 2004, he won the FIM Cross-Country Rallies World Championship. He took the third place in 2006 and captured silver in 2007.

Other accomplishments 
Ullevålseter won the Rallye des Pharaons in 2004 and claimed victory at the Merzouga Rally in 2014.

Personal 
He announced his engagement with former kickboxing world champion Mette Solli in May 2015.

A celebrity in Norway, Ullevålseter won the 2007 season of "Isdans", the Norwegian equivalent of Dancing on Ice, alongside Anna Pushkova. In 2013, he competed in "Skal vi danse", the Norwegian version of Dancing With The Stars.

References

Norwegian motorcycle racers
Enduro riders
Off-road motorcycle racers
Dakar Rally motorcyclists
1968 births
Living people
Sportspeople from Oslo